The Homeless One is a 1981 Swiss drama film directed by Villi Hermann. It was entered into the 13th Moscow International Film Festival.

Cast
 Omero Antonutti as Alfredo
 Francesca De Sapio
 Flavio Bucci as Il matlosa
 Nico Pepe as Zio Poldo
 Roger Jendly as Vincent
 Mario Marchetti
 Cleto Cremonesi
 Salvatore Landolina
 Roberto Pistone

References

External links
 

1981 films
1981 drama films
Swiss drama films
1980s Italian-language films
Films directed by Villi Hermann